Denís Tsargúsh (IPA /dɛˈnis t͡sʰɑrˈgʷɨʂ/, born 1 September 1987 in Gudauta, Abkhazia, Georgia, also known as Dinislam Tsargush, is a Russian freestyle wrestler of Abkhaz descent. He is a three-time European Champion, three-time World Champion and also won a bronze medal at the 2012 Summer Olympics. He is a Grand Master of Sports in Freestyle Wrestling.

He won the 74 kg weight class at the 2009, 2010 and 2014 FILA Wrestling World Championships.

He won the bronze medal at the 2012 Summer Olympics in the men's 74 kg category. At the 2014 World Wrestling Championships in the men's 74 kg category, Tsargush scored a 9–2 victory over Jordan Burroughs (U.S.), who had won the last three world level titles at the weight class, from 2011 to 2013. Tsargush also won a world championship at the junior level in 2007.

Championships and accomplishments
Olympic Bronze medal (London 2012)
Three-time World champion (2009, 2010, 2014)
Five time Russian nationals
Two-time winner Golden Grand Prix Ivan Yarygin (2010, 2012)
Three-time European champion (2010, 2011, 2012)
Gold medalist in 2013 Summer Universiade (Kazan, Tatarstan)
Winner Golden Grand prix Yaşar Doğu 2015 (Istanbul, Turkey)

References

External links
 

1987 births
Living people
Russian male sport wrestlers
Olympic bronze medalists for Russia
Wrestlers at the 2012 Summer Olympics
People from Gudauta
Sport wrestlers from Abkhazia
Olympic wrestlers of Russia
Olympic medalists in wrestling
Medalists at the 2012 Summer Olympics
Russian people of Abkhazian descent
World Wrestling Championships medalists
Universiade medalists in wrestling
Universiade gold medalists for Russia
Medalists at the 2013 Summer Universiade